The 1960 National 400 was a Grand National Series stock car race that was held on October 16, 1960, at Charlotte Motor Speedway in Concord, North Carolina.

The transition to purpose-built racecars began in the early 1960s and occurred gradually over that decade.  Changes made to the sport by the late 1960s brought an end to the "strictly stock" vehicles of the 1950s.

Background
Around 29,166 spectators traveled to Charlotte Motor Speedway to watch the race. Located in Concord, North Carolina, Charlotte Motor Speedway is a banked  quad-oval that opened a few months earlier for the inaugural World 600.

Charlotte Motor Speedway was designed and built by Bruton Smith and partner and driver Curtis Turner in 1959. The first World 600 NASCAR race was held at the  speedway on June 19, 1960. On December 8, 1961, the speedway filed bankruptcy notice.  Judge J.B. Craven of US District Court for Western North Carolina reorganized it under Chapter 10 of the Bankruptcy Act; Judge Craven appointed Robert "Red" Robinson as the track's trustee until March 1962.  At that point, a committee of major stockholders in the speedway was assembled, headed by A.C. Goines and furniture store owner Richard Howard.   Goines, Howard, and Robinson worked to secure loans and other monies to keep the speedway afloat.

Race report
Bob Barron and Friday Hassler would make their NASCAR Grand National debut appearances here. Unfortunately, this would be Bob Barron's only start of the 1960 NASCAR Grand National Series season. Charlie Glotzbach would also make his NASCAR big league debut at this race but to a much smaller fanfare.

The race was held on a dry circuit; with no precipitation recorded around the speedway.

It took three hours and thirty-two minutes to complete 267 laps on a paved oval track spanning . Seven cautions were waved by NASCAR officials for 34 laps. Speedy Thompson defeated Richard Petty by one lap and twelve seconds in front of nearly 30,000 spectators while going ; helping the Wood Brothers' racing team earn their one of their first NASCAR wins as owners. Thompson would get his penultimate win of his NASCAR Cup career in this race; winning for the last time at the 1960 Capital City 400.

Eight notable crew chiefs participated in the event; including Cotton Owens, Leonard Wood and Bud Moore. He would eventually blow a tire on lap 232; causing him to crash and lose the lead. There were fifty drivers who would ultimately participate in this event; all of them were American-born males.

Fred Lorenzen would earn the event's last-place finish for a vibration problem that he developed on lap 4; earning only $200 for that day ($ when adjusted for inflation). Lowe's was one of the corporate sponsors of this racing event; they still sponsor NASCAR to this very day through frequent Monster Energy NASCAR Cup Series champion Jimmie Johnson.

Qualifying

Failed to qualify: Buddy Baker (#20), Leroy Thomas, Wilbur Rakestraw (#99), Bob Duell (#95), Gerald Duke (#92), Speedy Thompson (#90), Charles Griffin (#78), Elmo Henderson (#70), Tiny Lund (#63), Jim Whitman (#60), Jim Cook (#38), Tommy Irwin (#36), Jimmy Massey (#21), LeeRoy Yarbrough

Top 10 finishers

Timeline
Section reference:

References

National 400
National 400
NASCAR races at Charlotte Motor Speedway